The two-color system of projection is a name given to a variety of methods of projecting a full-color image using (only) two different single-color projectors.  James Clerk Maxwell first suggested he had discovered such a projection system, but it was not reproduced until the 1950s, when Edwin Land accidentally noticed a similar effect while working on his three-color system of projection.

Despite Land's later work on the subject, the physics behind the success of this system of projection (and similar methods of apparent full-color projection involving only one color of light, sometimes in different polarizations) is not clearly understood since it involves not only the projected light but also the human visual system's response to it.

External links 
http://www.greatreality.com/Color2Color.htm

Display technology